The Brenner Prize is an Israeli literary prize awarded annually by the Hebrew Writers Association in Israel and the Haft Family Foundation.

It was founded in the name of the author Yosef Haim Brenner and was first awarded in 1945.

References

 
Israeli literary awards
Jewish literary awards
Hebrew literary awards
Israeli awards
Awards established in 1945